Pleurota pyropella is a moth of the family Oecophoridae. It is found in Portugal, France, Germany, Italy, Austria, Switzerland, the Czech Republic, Slovakia, Albania, Croatia, Slovenia, Bosnia and Herzegovina, Serbia, Hungary, Bulgaria, Romania, North Macedonia, Greece, Turkey, Ukraine, Russia, as well as on Corsica, Sicily, Cyprus and Crete. Outside of the Europe, the range extends to the eastern Palearctic. The species is also present in the Near East and North Africa.

Subspecies
Pleurota pyropella pyropella
Pleurota pyropella candia Back, 1973
Pleurota pyropella siciliana Back, 1973 (Sicily)
Pleurota pyropella idalia Meyrick, 1923 (Cyprus)
Pleurota pyropella semicanella Constant, 1885 (Corsica)

References

Moths described in 1775
Oecophoridae